The Lithuanian Indoor Athletics Championships  is an annual indoor track and field competition organised by the Athletic Federation of Lithuania, which serves as the national championship for the sport in Lithuania. Recent competitions were held in Klaipėda. The first championships was held in 1948, but as the country was subsumed into the Soviet Union after World War II, the Soviet Athletics Championships served as the national event during this period. After the Act of the Re-Establishment of the State of Lithuania, a national Lithuanian championships was restored and held in 1990.

Events
The following athletics events feature as standard on the Lithuanian Indoor Championships programme:

 Sprint: 60 m, 200 m, 400 m
 Distance track events: 800 m, 1500 m, 3000 m
 Hurdles: 60 m hurdles
 Steeplechase: 1500 m steeplechase, 2000 m steeplechase
 Jumps: long jump, triple jump, high jump, pole vault
 Throws: shot put
 Combined events: heptathlon (men), pentathlon (women)
 Racewalking: 5000 m walk (men), 3000 m walk (women)

Former events that were held at the championships include sprints over 30 m, 35 m, and 50 metres, 10,000 m racewalking, and the 4 × 200 metres relay.

References

External links
Lithuanian Athletics Federation website

 
Recurring sporting events established in 1948
Recurring sporting events established in 1990
1948 establishments in Lithuania
1990 establishments in Lithuania
Annual events in Lithuania
Events in Klaipėda
National indoor athletics competitions
Athletics competitions in Lithuania